The Silva Gadelica are two volumes of medieval tales taken from Irish folklore, translated into modern English by Standish Hayes O'Grady and published in 1892. The volumes contain many stories that together comprise the Fenian Cycle.

Contents

The Silva Gadelica contains two volumes, the first containing the medieval script and the second the English translations. The stories were translated from mostly vellum documents contained in the British Museum. When first published the Silva Gadelica included 31 tales and, in the second volume containing translations, over 600 pages of fine print.

The largest and most important translation in Silva Gadelica is of the Acallam na Senórach or "Colloquy of the Ancients".

Reception

The Journal of the Royal Society of Antiquaries of Ireland described the volumes as containing "many passages of great beauty." Referencing the opening passage of the poem Caeilte's lay,

The journal writes that it "cannot recall any poem in the whole range of Irish literature more beautiful, or in which the subtle cadence of feeling peculiar to Irish expression is more perfect."

According to The Quarterly Review, O'Grady wrote the Silva Gadelica over a period of over 40 years. Further translations of Irish stories in the British museum were later completed by Robin Flower, effectively completing the project begun by the Silva Gadelica.

See also
Fianna
Saint Patrick
Irish Fairy Tales
Fionn mac Cumhaill

External links

References

Fenian Cycle
Irish books
Cultural depictions of Saint Patrick
1892 books
Collections of fairy tales
Irish folklore